Group Portrait with a Lady is a 1977 German-French drama film directed by Aleksandar Petrović. It was entered into the 1977 Cannes Film Festival. It is based on the novel of the same name  by German Nobel-Prize winning novelist Heinrich Böll.

Cast

References

External links

1977 films
West German films
1970s German-language films
1970s French-language films
1977 drama films
French drama films
German drama films
Films based on works by Heinrich Böll
Films directed by Aleksandar Petrović
Films set in Germany
Films set in the 1930s
Films set in the 1940s
Films about Nazi Germany
German nonlinear narrative films
French nonlinear narrative films
German multilingual films
French multilingual films
1977 multilingual films
1970s French films
1970s German films